The 2004 Montana State Bobcats football team was an American football team that represented Montana State University in the Big Sky Conference (Big Sky) during the 2004 NCAA Division I-AA football season. In their fifth season under head coach Mike Kramer, the Bobcats compiled a 6–5 record (4–3 against Big Sky opponents) and tied for third place in the Big Sky. Quarterback Travis Lulay led the team on offense.

Schedule

References

Montana State
Montana State Bobcats football seasons
Montana State Bobcats football